Metlakatla (Tsimshian: Maxłakxaała or Wil uks t’aa mediik; Lingít: Tàakw.àani) is a census-designated place (CDP) on Annette Island in Prince of Wales-Hyder Census Area, Alaska, United States. At the 2010 census the population was 1,405; this had grown to 1,454 by the 2020 census.

Since the late 19th century, it has been the major settlement of the Metlakatla Indian Community of the federally recognized Annette Island Reserve, the only remaining reserve in Alaska.  The Metlakatla voted to opt out of the Alaska Native Claims Settlement Act of the 1970s and retained rights to their land and waters. Membership in the community is primarily by lineage; it consists primarily of Tsimshian people and also includes those from other Alaskan Native tribes who wish to join the Metlakatla Indian Community as a bona fide member. Bona fide membership is granted upon approval of the Metlakatla Tribal Council and Executives.

History 

Metlakatla comes from Maxłakxaała, a Tsimshian word meaning "saltwater passage."  Metlakatla was named after another village of the same name ("Old Metlakatla") in British Columbia, which is on Metlakatla Pass, near Prince Rupert.  In a more ancient time, it was a Tlingit hunting ground known as Taquan. The Tsimshian were granted permission to own the land by Chief Johnson of the Tlingit tribe.

In 1886, William Duncan, an English tannery employee and lay member of the Church Missionary Society, had a doctrinal dispute with the Church authorities in Metlakatla, B.C. He and a devoted group of Tsimshian followers decided to leave Metlakatla. Duncan went to Washington, D.C., in the United States and asked the U.S. government to give his group land in Alaska. The U.S. under President Cleveland gave them Annette Island after a Tsimshian search committee in seagoing canoes discovered its calm bay, accessible beaches, nearby waterfall, and abundant fish.

In 1887, the group arrived on the island and built a settlement in the Port Chester area. They laid out the town in a European-style grid pattern. It contained a church, a school, a cannery, and a sawmill. They named the town New Metlakatla, after the town they had left behind, but later dropped the "New." In 1888, William Duncan returned to Washington and lobbied the U.S. Congress for an Indian reserve on Annette Island. Although the reservation system had not been used in Alaska, Congress granted his request in 1891. Duncan remained at Metlakatla until his death in 1918.

During World War II, the United States made a treaty with the Metlakatla Indian Community to permit construction and operation of a military airbase on Annette Island. In exchange, the US promised to build a road connecting the ocean-side city to Alaska's Inside Passage (in order to allow year-round ferry service to Ketchikan).  The airfield on Annette Island was garrisoned by Canadians during the war. This airfield became "the first Canadian force ever based in U.S. territory to directly assist in American defense."

After the war, the property was adapted as a United States Coast Guard search and rescue base. This airfield served the area commercially until the 1970s, when the new Ketchikan Airport was built at Gravina Island in the Inside Passage.

Annette Islands Reserve, including surrounding islands, today is the only Indian reservation in Alaska. In the 1970s, the Metlakatla did not accept the Alaska Native Claims Settlement Act and thus kept the reservation and maintained sovereign immunity.  "Annette Islands Reserve consists of 132,000 acres of land and water base. Metlakatla Indian Community has exclusive commercial and subsistence fishing rights to the islands’ waterways extending from 3,000 feet at mean low tide."

Travelers into Metlakatla usually reach it via the Alaska Marine Highway ferry. They can also travel to Ketchikan on Revillagigedo Island and cross the Revillagigedo Channel to Annette Island by boat or seaplane.

More than 50 years after the end of WWII, in 1997 the US Federal Government began construction of the cross-island road promised to Metlakatla under its wartime M.O.A. treaty. From 1997 to 2007, a joint task force under the overall command of Alaska Command, and led by the Missouri Army National Guard, worked at constructing a 15-mile road from one side of Annette Island to the other.  Members of the Active and Reserve components of the Army, Navy, United States Air Force, and the Marines deployed to the island on 2- to 3-week rotations to build the road.

Geography and climate

Metlakatla is located at  (55.126916, −131.576393).

Metlakatla has a Marine west coast climate (Köppen Cfb), with windy and wet weather year-round, cool winters, and mild summers, and straddles the border between USDA Plant Hardiness Zones 7 and 8. During summer, there is an average of 23 days with + highs, and rain still falls on around half of the days. Precipitation averages more than  annually, with June and July being the driest months and October and November the wettest. In addition, the Annette Island Airport holds the Alaska state monthly record high temperatures for April ( on April 29, 1976) and November ( on November 1, 1970).

Demographics

Metlakatla first appeared on the 1890 U.S. Census as the unincorporated (Tsimshian) village of "Metlakahtla." From 1900-30, it returned as Metlakatla. From 1940-60, it was spelled as "Metlakahtla" again. In 1970 and in every census since, it has been spelled as Metlakatla. It was made a census-designated place (CDP) beginning in 1980.

As of the census of 2000, there were 1,375 people, 469 households, and 338 families residing in the CDP. There were 531 housing units at an average density of 229.2/sq mi (88.4/km2). The racial makeup of the CDP was 9.53% White, 0.22% Black or African American, 81.82% Native American, 0.07% Asian, 0.51% from other races, and 7.85% from two or more races.  1.82% of the population were Hispanic or Latino of any race.

There were 469 households, out of which 38.8% had children under the age of 18 living with them, 48.0% were married couples living together, 15.6% had a female householder with no husband present, and 27.9% were non-families. 23.5% of all households were made up of individuals, and 6.6% had someone living alone who was 65 years of age or older.  The average household size was 2.93 and the average family size was 3.50.

In the CDP, the population was spread out, with 33.1% under the age of 18, 9.4% from 18 to 24, 28.7% from 25 to 44, 21.6% from 45 to 64, and 7.2% who were 65 years of age or older.  The median age was 31 years. For every 100 females, there were 108.3 males.  For every 100 females age 18 and over, there were 115.0 males.

The median income for a household in the CDP was $43,516, and the median income for a family was $49,671. Males had a median income of $36,696 versus $22,292 for females. The per capita income for the CDP was $16,140.  About 7.7% of families and 8.0% of the population were below the poverty line, including 9.7% of those under age 18 and 6.3% of those age 65 or over.

Education
Metlakatla is served by the Annette Island School District.

A free Adult Education and GED program serves the community. It is run through the Southeast Regional Resource Center, which is based out of Juneau.

See also 
Metlakatla Seaplane Base (IATA: MTM, ICAO: PAMM, FAA LID: MTM)

References

External links
 Metlakatla.com

Census-designated places in Alaska
Census-designated places in Prince of Wales–Hyder Census Area, Alaska
Census-designated places in Unorganized Borough, Alaska
Populated coastal places in Alaska on the Pacific Ocean